The 22nd (East Africa) Infantry Brigade was a brigade sized formation of the British Army, which was founded on 19 September 1939 in British East Africa. The brigade was initially called the 2nd (East Africa) Infantry Brigade, but was redesignated on 18 October 1940 as the 22nd (East Africa) Infantry Brigade. The brigade was composed of units from the King's African Rifles, the Northern Rhodesia Regiment and the Rhodesian African Rifles.

During the Second World War, the brigade formed part of the 2nd, the 11th, the 12th (African) Divisions, and the 82nd (West Africa) Division. The division also spent time attached various Indian Army divisions and corps-level formations. The brigade took part in the East African, and the Burma Campaigns. It ended the war based in Burma.

General officers commanding
The brigade had the following commanders, during the Second World War.

Order of battle
2nd (East Africa) Brigade (until 17 October 1940)

 1st Battalion, King's African Rifles (KAR) (from 2 October 1939)
 6th Battalion, KAR (from 6 October 1939)
 5th Battalion, KAR (from 13 October 1939)

22nd (East Africa) Brigade (from 18 October 1940)
 5th Battalion, KAR (until 31 May 1943)
 5th Battalion (Kenya), KAR (from 1 June 1943, until 9 August 1944)
 1/1st Battalion, KAR (until 31 May 1943)
 1st Battalion (Nyasaland), KAR (from 1 June 1943)
 1/6th Battalion, KAR (until 31 May 1943)
 6th Battalion (Tanganyika Territory), KAR (from 1 June 1943 until 20 July 1943)
 3rd Battalion, Northern Rhodesia Regiment (from 21 July 1943)
 1st Battalion, Rhodesian African Rifles (from 14 September 1944)

From December 1941, the brigade operated as a brigade group and commanded the following units:
 56th (Uganda) Field Battery, East African Artillery (from 27 April 1942 until 26 December 1942)
 9th Field Regiment, Royal Artillery (from 9 June 1942 until 14 November 1942)
 60th (East Africa) Field Company, East African Engineers (from 12 May 1942 until 1 July 1943)
 59th (East Africa) Field Company, East African Engineers (from 8 July 1944)
 22nd (East Africa) Infantry Brigade Group Company, East Africa Army Service Corps
 2nd (Northern Rhodesia) Field Ambulance, Royal Medical Corps (until 17 February 1942)
 5th (Kenya) Field Ambulance, Royal Medical Corps (from 9 March 1942 until 30 April 1944)
 110th Camp Reception Station, Royal Medical Corps (from 10 July 1944 until 12 March 1945)
 6th (East Africa) Infantry Brigade Workshop, East Africa Army Electrical Mechanical Engineers (from 7 December 1944)
 22nd (East Africa) Infantry Brigade Provost Section

Citations

References

 

Infantry brigades of the British Army in World War II
1939 establishments in the United Kingdom
Military units and formations established in 1939